Žižkovo Pole is a municipality and village in Havlíčkův Brod District in the Vysočina Region of the Czech Republic. It has about 400 inhabitants.

Administrative parts
The village of Macourov is an administrative part of Žižkovo Pole.

Etymology
The name means literally "Žižka's field".

Geography
It lies in the Upper Sázava Hills.

History

The first written mention of Žižkovo Pole is from 1303. The settlement was probably founded at the end of the 13th century and was mostly populated by miners.

Sights
In the southern part of the municipality, between the fields, is Žižka's Mound. It dates from 1874.

References

External links

Villages in Havlíčkův Brod District
Jan Žižka